Radiophysics and Quantum Electronics is a monthly peer-reviewed scientific journal covering all aspects of radiophysics and quantum electronics. It is the English translation of the Russian journal IIzvestiya VUZ. Radiofizika. It is published by Springer Science+Business Media on behalf of the Radiophysical Research Institute (Russian Ministry of Education and Science) and the N. I. Lobachevsky State University of Nizhny Novgorod. The journal was established in 1958 and the editor-in-chief is Vladimir V. Kocharovsky.

Abstracting and indexing 
The journal is abstracted and indexed in:

According to the Journal Citation Reports, the journal has a 2020 impact factor of 0.770.

References

External links 
 

Springer Science+Business Media academic journals
Quantum mechanics journals
English-language journals
Monthly journals
Publications established in 1958